Tim is a village situated in the Ringkøbing-Skjern Municipality, in the Central Denmark Region.

Tim Church is located in the small village of Tim Kirkeby west of Tim.

References 

Cities and towns in the Central Denmark Region
Ringkøbing-Skjern Municipality